Rhodanobacteraceae is a family of bacteria of the order Xanthomonadales. The type genus is Rhodanobacter.

References

Xanthomonadales
Bacteria families